Hichem Khalil Cherabi (born 30 March 1993) is an Algerian track and field athlete who competes in the pole vault. In June 2015 he improved Lakhdar Rahal's national record of 5.34 m which had stood since 1979.

He began his international career in 2014 and placed fourth at the 2014 African Championships in Athletics. His first international medal came at the 2015 Arab Athletics Championships, where he took the bronze. Cherabi established himself as the continent's best vaulter with gold medal wins at the 2015 African Games and 2016 African Championships in Athletics. He was the top ranked African pole vaulter in 2015.

International competitions

References

External links

Living people
1993 births
Algerian male pole vaulters
African Games gold medalists for Algeria
African Games medalists in athletics (track and field)
Athletes (track and field) at the 2015 African Games
Athletes (track and field) at the 2019 African Games
African Games gold medalists in athletics (track and field)
Islamic Solidarity Games competitors for Algeria
Islamic Solidarity Games medalists in athletics
21st-century Algerian people